Ateş was a Turkish daily newspaper. It was published from 7 December 1995 to 15 February 1999. It had been acquired in August 1998 from Dinç Bilgin's Sabah group by Korkmaz Yiğit.

References

1995 establishments in Turkey
1999 disestablishments in Turkey
Daily newspapers published in Turkey
Defunct daily newspapers
Defunct newspapers published in Turkey
Newspapers established in 1995
Newspapers published in Istanbul
Publications disestablished in 1999
Turkish-language newspapers